400th may refer to:

400th anniversary of the Authorized King James Version, set of events and exhibitions in 2011
400th Bombardment Group, inactive United States Air Force unit
400th Missile Squadron, inactive United States Air Force unit
America's 400th Anniversary or Jamestown 2007
Jamestown 400th Anniversary gold five dollar coin
Jamestown 400th Anniversary silver dollar

See also
400 (number)
400, the year 400 (CD) of the Julian calendar
400 BC